Ivazzade Halil Pasha (1724–1777) was an Ottoman statesman who served as Grand Vizier in 1769. He was the son of Grand Vizier Ivaz Mehmed Pasha. He was of Albanian origin.

He took part in Russian Wars under the title of serdar-i ekrem (Commander General of the Army). 

After he had been excused from military service, he was sequentially appointed to the governorship of the Sanjak of Eğriboz (eastern Central Greece), the Eyalet of Bosnia, the Eyalet of Salonika, and the Eyalet of Sivas.

References

18th-century Grand Viziers of the Ottoman Empire
1724 births
1777 deaths
Albanian Grand Viziers of the Ottoman Empire
People of the Russo-Turkish War (1768–1774)